At the Edge of Light is the twenty-fifth studio album by English guitarist and songwriter Steve Hackett, released on 25 January 2019 by InsideOut Records.

Release
The album was announced on 25 October 2018. It will be available on CD, a two LP and CD set, a digital download, and as a CD and DVD Digipak mediabook with a 5.1 surround sound mix and a behind the scenes documentary.

On 30 November 2018, "Under the Eye of the Sun" was released as the first single off the album.

Track listing

Personnel
Music

Steve Hackett – electric & acoustic guitars, 12 string guitar, dobro, bass guitar, harmonica, vocals
Durga McBroom – vocals on "Underground Railroad"
Lorelei McBroom – vocals on "Underground Railroad"
Nick D'Virgilio – drums on "Those Golden Wings"
Simon Phillips – drums on "Hungry Years"
Sheema Mukherjee – sitar on "Shadow and Flame"
Malik Mansurov – tar on "Fallen Walls and Pedestals"
Jonas Reingold – bass guitar on "Beasts in Our Time", "Under the Eye of the Sun" and "Hungry Years"
Paul Stillwell – didgeridoo on "Under the Eye of the Sun"
Gulli Briem – drums, percussion on "Under the Eye of the Sun"
Rob Townsend – tenor saxophone, flute, duduk, bass clarinet on "Beasts in Our Time" and "Under the Eye of the Sun"
Amanda Lehmann – vocals on "Under the Eye of the Sun", "Underground Railroad", "Those Golden Wings", "Hungry Years" and "Peace"
John Hackett – flute on "Beasts in Our Time", "Under the Eye of the Sun", "Those Golden Wings" and "Conflict"
Gary O'Toole – drums on "Fallen Walls and Pedestals"
Roger King – keyboards, programming, orchestral arrangements (except on "Descent")
Benedict Fenner – keyboards, programming on "Hungry Years" and "Descent"
Dick Driver – double bass on "Under the Eye of the Sun" and "Hungry Years"
Christine Townsend – violin, viola on "Those Golden Wings"

Production
Steve Hackett - production
Roger King – production, engineering (except on "Descent")
Benedict Fenner – production, engineering on "Descent"

Charts

References

2019 albums
Steve Hackett albums
Inside Out Music albums